In mathematics, in particular in algebraic geometry and differential geometry, Dolbeault cohomology (named after Pierre Dolbeault) is an analog of de Rham cohomology for complex manifolds.  Let M be a complex manifold.  Then the Dolbeault cohomology groups  depend on a pair of integers p and q and are realized as a subquotient of the space of complex differential forms of degree (p,q).

Construction of the cohomology groups
Let Ωp,q be the vector bundle of complex differential forms of degree (p,q). In the article on complex forms, the Dolbeault operator is defined as a differential operator on smooth sections

Since

this operator has some associated cohomology.  Specifically, define the cohomology to be the quotient space

Dolbeault cohomology of vector bundles

which acts on a section  by

The Dolbeault operator satisfies the integrability condition  and so Dolbeault cohomology with coefficients in  can be defined as above:

Dolbeault–Grothendieck lemma 
In order to establish the Dolbeault isomorphism we need to prove the Dolbeault–Grothendieck lemma (or -Poincaré lemma). First we prove a one-dimensional version of the -Poincaré lemma; we shall use the following generalised form of the Cauchy integral representation for smooth functions:

Lemma (-Poincaré lemma on the complex plane): Let  be as before and  a smooth form, then
 
satisfies  on 

Proof.

 

and define

Since  in  then  is clearly well-defined and smooth; we note that

applying the generalised Cauchy formula to  we find

Since  was arbitrary, the lemma is now proved.

Proof of Dolbeault–Grothendieck lemma

Now are ready to prove the Dolbeault–Grothendieck lemma; the proof presented here is due to Grothendieck.

Lemma (Dolbeault–Grothendieck): Let  where  open and  such that , then there exists  which satisfies:  on 

Before starting the proof we note that any -form can be written as

for multi-indices , therefore we can reduce the proof to the case .

Proof. Then suppose  and observe that we can write

Since  is -closed it follows that  are holomorphic in variables  and smooth in the remaining ones on the polydisc . Moreover we can apply the -Poincaré lemma to the smooth functions  on the open ball , hence there exist a family of smooth functions  which satisfy 

Define 

 

then

therefore we can apply the induction hypothesis to it, there exists  such that

and  ends the induction step. QED

Lemma (extended Dolbeault-Grothendieck).

Proof.

Case 1. Let , and we cover  with polydiscs , then by the Dolbeault–Grothendieck lemma we can find forms  of bidegree  on  open such that ; we want to show that 

We proceed by induction on : the case when  holds by the previous lemma.

Then we find a -form  defined in an open neighbourhood of  such that .

hence the form 

 

satisfies

Case 2.

Again, we proceed by induction on : for  the answer is given by the Dolbeault-Grothendieck lemma.

where  are polynomials and 

 

but then the form 

 

satisfies

which completes the induction step; therefore we have built a sequence  which uniformly converges to some -form  such that . QED

Dolbeault's theorem
Dolbeault's theorem is a complex analog of de Rham's theorem.  It asserts that the Dolbeault cohomology is isomorphic to the sheaf cohomology of the sheaf of holomorphic differential forms.  Specifically,

where  is the sheaf of holomorphic p forms on M. 

A version of the Dolbeault theorem also holds for Dolbeault cohomology with coefficients in a holomorphic vector bundle . Namely one has an isomorphism

A version for logarithmic forms has also been established.

Proof
Let  be the fine sheaf of  forms of type . Then the -Poincaré lemma says that the sequence

is exact. Like any long exact sequence, this sequence breaks up into short exact sequences. The long exact sequences of cohomology corresponding to these give the result, once one uses that the higher cohomologies of a fine sheaf vanish.

Explicit example of calculation 
The Dolbeault cohomology of the -dimensional complex projective space is

We apply the following well-known fact from Hodge theory: 

 

because  is a compact Kähler complex manifold. Then  and 

Furthermore we know that  is Kähler, and  where  is the fundamental form associated to the Fubini–Study metric (which is indeed Kähler), therefore  and  whenever  which yields the result.

See also

Serre duality
-lemma, which describes the potential of a -exact differential form in the setting of compact Kähler manifolds.

Footnotes

References

Cohomology theories
Complex manifolds
Hodge theory